The 2004 NRL Grand Final was the conclusive and premiership-deciding game of the 2004 NRL season. It was contested by the Sydney Roosters, who had finished the regular season in 1st place, and the Canterbury-Bankstown Bulldogs, who had finished the regular season in 2nd place. After both sides eliminated the rest of 2004's top eight teams over the finals series, they faced each other in a grand final for the first time since the 1980 NSWRFL season's decider.

Background

For the second consecutive year, the NRL grand final featured two Sydney-based teams.

Sydney Roosters

The Sydney Roosters finished the 2004 regular season in 1st place, taking out the minor premiership. They subsequently won their two finals matches against the Canberra Raiders 38–12 and then the North Queensland Cowboys 19–16 to make their third consecutive grand final and their fourth in five seasons.

Canterbury-Bankstown Bulldogs

The Canterbury-Bankstown Bulldogs (that season known as just the Bulldogs) finished the 2004 regular season 2nd (out of 15). They lost their first match of the finals series against the North Queensland Cowboys 22–30 but won their next two against the Melbourne Storm 43–18 and the Penrith Panthers 30–14 to reach their first grand final since 1998.

Teams
Luke Ricketson would miss the match through suspension, after he was found guilty and suspended for three matches by the NRL Judiciary in the week leading up to the grand final. Ricketson had been charged with a grade three striking charge in the Roosters preliminary final victory over North Queensland. Roosters centre Justin Hodges was more fortunate than Ricketson, escaping suspension for a suspect tackle in the same match. Teammate Chris Flannery would take his place on the bench for the Roosters against doctor's orders, after being rushed to hospital for surgery on a ruptured testicle suffered in the preliminary final. It was also former Australian captain Brad Fittler's last game of first grade rugby league before retirement.

Regular Bulldogs captain Steve Price was ruled out of the match after injuring his knee in the preliminary final against Penrith. He was replaced as captain by Andrew Ryan.

Match details
Pre-match entertainment included performances by Chris Isaak and Australian rock band Grinspoon.

First half
After 13 minutes, Sydney took the first try of the game with Chris Walker scoring the try and Craig Fitzgibbon converting giving Sydney a 6–0 lead. Ten minutes later winger Matt Utai scored the first try for the Bulldogs bringing the score back to 6–4, after Hazem El Masri missing the conversion attempt. A few minutes later El Masri levelled the scores at 6–6 with a penalty goal. Just after the 30 minute mark, Brett Finch kicked a field goal to give Sydney a narrow 7–6 lead. Two minutes later Anthony Tupou made a 30-metre break for Sydney before passing to teammate Anthony Minichiello to cross under the posts with Fitzgibbon converting to give Sydney a 13–6 lead. At the 37th minute, Minichiello looked to have his second try, however the try was denied by the video referee and the Roosters penalised for an obstruction.

Second half
Two minutes into the second half, Utai got his second try with El Masri converting, bringing the score back to 13–12. In the 53rd minute El Masri crossed over for a try, which was awarded by the video referee despite Roosters players complaints of a double movement. El Masri would narrowly missed the conversion, but his try would give the Bulldogs the lead 16–13. With one minute left and the score remaining at 16–13, Sydney's Michael Crocker made a half break on the Bulldogs 40-meter line, but was tackled by stand in Bulldogs captain Andrew Ryan, resulting in Crocker losing the ball. The desperate tackle from Ryan ending the match to give the Bulldogs their 8th premiership.

This marked the first (and only) time in 2004 that the Roosters lost a match after leading at half-time.

Match summary

See also
2005 World Club Challenge

References

External links
2004 NRL Grand Final at NRL.com
Match replay at NRL.com
2004 NRL Grand Final at rugbyleagueproject.org
2004 NRL Grand Final  at sportsphotography.net

NRL Grand Finals
Grand final
Sydney Roosters matches
Canterbury-Bankstown Bulldogs matches